Philippe Grimbert (born 1948 in Paris) is a French writer and psychoanalyst.

Biography 
After studying psychology in 1968, Philippe Grimbert realized a Lacanian orientation analysis, before opening his own practice in Paris. He also worked in two medico-educational institutes, at Asnières and Colombes, for autistic or psychotic adolescents.

Passionate about music, dance and computer science, he published several essays, including Psychanalyse de la chanson (1996) and Pas de fumée sans Freud (1999).

La Petite Robe de Paul, published in 2001, made him known in general literature. He is the author of six novels, in particular  (2004), which sold more than 1,500,000 copies and which was rewarded by the prix Goncourt des lycéens in 2004, the Grand prix des lectrices de Elle and the prix Wizo in 2005. In 2007, this novel was adapted to cinema by Claude Miller, with Patrick Bruel and Cécile de France in the lead roles.

Works

Novels 
 2001: La Petite robe de Paul, Éditions Grasset, 
 2004: Un secret, Grasset, Grand prix des lectrices de Elle
 2009: La Mauvaise rencontre, Grasset, 
 2011: , Grasset, 
 2014: Nom de dieu !, Grasset, 
 2015: Rudik, l'autre Nureyev, Paris, Plon, 

 Audio books
 2008: A Secret,  - read by the author
 2009: La Mauvaise rencontre, Audiolib - read by the author

Essays 
 Psychanalyse de la chanson, Paris, Les Belles Lettres, Archimbaud, 1996, (L'inconscient à l'œuvre ; 2). 
 Pas de fumée sans Freud : psychanalyse du fumeur, Paris, Armand Colin, 1999, (Renouveaux en psychanalyse). 
 Évitez le divan : petit manuel à l'usage de ceux qui tiennent à leurs symptômes, Paris, Hachette littératures, 2001. 
 Chantons sous la psy, Paris, Hachette Littératures, 2002. 
 Avec Freud au quotidien : essais de psychanalyse appliquée, Paris, Grasset, 2012, 316 p.

Others 
 Philippe Grimbert and Claude Miller, Les Secrets d'Un secret, photos by Thierry Valletoux, preface by Amanda Sthers, Paris, Verlhac, 2007  (book about the film adaptation of Claude Miller A Secret released the same year, after the eponymous novel by Philippe Grimbert.

Participations

Collaboration 

Prefaces 
 2008: Collective, Mots pour maux, collection of short stories, Éditions Gallimard
 2009: Philippe Assoulen, Les champions juifs dans l'histoire : des sportifs face l'antisémitisme, Paris, Imago
 2009: Helen Epstein, Écrire la vie : non-fiction, vérité et psychanalyse, translated from English (United-States) by Cécile Nelson, Paris, La Cause des livres
 2013: Collective, Je chante avec mon bébé : 107 chansons et comptines expliquées aux parents, Au merle moqueur- 1 book and 2 CDs

Adaptations of the work

Cinema 
 2007: A Secret, French film by Claude Miller, with Patrick Bruel, Cécile de France, Julie Depardieu, Ludivine Sagnier

Television 

Theatre 

Bibliography and audiography

References

External links 
 Philippe Grimbert on Babelio
 Biographie de Philippe Grimbert 
 Philippe Grimbert on France Inter
 Le frère du fils unique on L'Express (1 December 2004)
 Interview de Philippe Grimbert on CAIRN
 Philippe Grimbert on Psychologie

21st-century French novelists
21st-century French essayists
French psychoanalysts
Prix Goncourt des lycéens winners
Audiobook narrators
1948 births
Writers from Paris
Living people